Nathaniel George Philips (1795–1831) was an English painter trained in Edinburgh and member of the Academy of St Luke.

Life
He was the youngest son of John Leigh Philips of Mayfield, Manchester, where he was born on 9 June 1795. He was educated at Manchester Grammar School, and entered the University of Edinburgh. While pursuing medical studies he made the acquaintance, of Sir William Allan and Scottish artists. A private income allowed him to go to Italy for three years.

On the death of Henry Fuseli, he was, in 1825, elected to fill his place as a member of the Academy of St. Luke. He settled as an artist in Liverpool.

Philips, who also practised etching, died unmarried at his residence, Rodney Street, Liverpool, on 1 August 1831.

Works
Philips exhibited landscapes at the Liverpool Academy and the Royal Manchester Institution. The work by which he is best remembered is a series of twenty-eight engravings on copper, many of them from his own drawings, of old halls in Lancashire and Cheshire. These were originally issued in 1822–4 (possibly only 25 then printed). All were reissued in book form in 1893, letterpress by twenty-four local contributors, and a memoir of the artist.

References

External links
 Nathaniel George Philips, collections of the British Museum.
 N. G. Philips, National Trust Collections .
Attribution

1795 births
1831 deaths
19th-century English painters
English male painters
Painters from Rome
Alumni of the University of Edinburgh
19th-century English male artists